The Misery of Civil War is a 1680 tragedy by the English writer John Crowne. It was originally staged by the Duke's Company at the Dorset Garden Theatre in London. The play was staged at the height of the Popish Plot, something Crowne addressed in his prologue. Although he states that "by his feeble skill 'tis built alone, The Divine Shakespeare did not lay one Stone" the plot in fact drew heavily on Henry VI, Part 2 and Part 3 

The original cast included Joseph Williams as Henry the Sixth, William Smith as Edward, John Bowman as  Duke of Clarence, Thomas Gillow as  Richard, Thomas Betterton as Earl of Warwick, Thomas Percival as Old Lord Clifford, John Wiltshire  as Young Clifford, Mary Lee as Queen Margaret, Mary Betterton as Lady Grey and Elizabeth Currer as  Lady Eleanor Butler.

References

Bibliography
 Murray, Barbara A. Restoration Shakespeare: Viewing the Voice. Fairleigh Dickinson University Press, 2001.
 Van Lennep, W. The London Stage, 1660-1800: Volume One, 1660-1700. Southern Illinois University Press, 1960.

1680 plays
West End plays
Tragedy plays
Plays based on actual events
Plays by John Crowne
Plays set in England
Plays set in the 15th century
Plays about English royalty